The Phillipsburg Commercial Historic District is a historic district in Phillipsburg, Warren County, New Jersey. The district was added to the National Register of Historic Places on October 8, 2008 for its local history and representative late 19th and early 20th century commercial structures. It includes 70 contributing resources.

Gallery of contributing properties

References

Phillipsburg, New Jersey
National Register of Historic Places in Warren County, New Jersey
Historic districts on the National Register of Historic Places in New Jersey
New Jersey Register of Historic Places
Italianate architecture in New Jersey
Queen Anne architecture in New Jersey
1811 establishments in New Jersey
Buildings and structures in Warren County, New Jersey